This list of tallest buildings in Berlin ranks skyscrapers, free standing structures and high-rises in the German capital of Berlin by height. The tallest structure in Berlin is the Fernsehturm Berlin, which rises .

A cluster of office high rise buildings is located at Potsdamer Platz in the Mitte district and at Breitscheidplatz in the Charlottenburg-Wilmersdorf district.

Due to increasing population, tourism and commercial activities the construction of residential, hotel and office high-rises has gained importance in Berlin after the year 2000.

Tallest structures
The list includes existing free standing structures and buildings (above ) in the city of Berlin as of 2017. 
The list does not include the mast radiator Sender Scholzplatz (230 metres) and the Richtfunkstelle Berlin-Frohnau (117 metres).
The list does not include more than 15 chimneys of power plants with heights from 100–170 metres.
The list does not include more than 10 church towers with heights from 60–90 metres.
The list does not include more than 60 residential buildings with heights from 60–80 metres. 
The list does not include bell towers or monuments like the Berlin Victory Column (67 metres).

Buildings under construction

Tallest demolished buildings

See also
List of tallest buildings in Germany
List of tallest structures in Germany
List of tallest structures in the world by country
List of tallest towers in the world

References

External links
Skyscrapers in Berlin in www.skyscraperpage.com

 
Berlin
Bui